Air Force Area is an area in Gorakhpur in the Indian state of Uttar Pradesh. It is spread over a large area including Kushmi Jungle, Forest Club, and Vinod Van Zoo, located near Gorakhpur airport.  Air Force Area has a one-passenger railway station, the Kushmi railway station. The Area has a local railway station; called Gorakhpur Cantt (Chawani) which is the passway to the Main Railway Station of  Gorakhpur Junction

Demographics
 India census, Air Force Area had a population of 9,593. Males constituted 55% of the population and females 45%. The literacy rate of 76% is higher than the national average of 59.5%; with 60% of the males and 40% of females literate. 13% of the population was under 6 years of age.

References

Cities and towns in Gorakhpur district